Gurudev Gupta was an Indian politician and renowned journalist. He was a Member of Parliament, representing Madhya Pradesh in the Rajya Sabha the upper house of India's Parliament as a member of the Indian National Congress. He along with his brothers Shri Pooranchand Gupta and Shri J C Arya established the Hindi daily newspaper "Dainik Jagran" in 1942 from Jhasi. Today the said newspaper is a mega brand in the print media industry of India and is the largest circulated newspaper of the country.

References

Rajya Sabha members from Madhya Pradesh
Indian National Congress politicians
1919 births
2000 deaths